Tent revivals, also known as tent meetings, are a gathering of Christian worshipers in a tent erected specifically for revival meetings, evangelism, and healing crusades. Tent revivals have had both local and national ministries.

The tent revival is generally a large tent or tents erected for a community gathering in which people gather to hear a preacher in hopes of healing, peace, forgiveness, etc. In the continental United States, from an administrative perspective tent revivals have ranged from small, locally based tents holding as few as a hundred people to large organizations with a fleet of trucks and tents able to hold thousands.

Most tent revivals in the U.S. have been held by Methodist Christians (inclusive of the holiness movement), as well as Pentecostal Christians. Some tent meetings are ecumenical, with the participation of Christian preachers from different denominations. As tent revivals are held outdoors, they have attracted people who after hearing the preaching undergo a conversion experience and join a local Christian church. With radio and television playing an increasingly important part in American culture, some preachers such as Oral Roberts, a very successful tent revivalist, made the transition to these media. Such pioneers were the early televangelists. Other evangelists who have been noted for their continued use of tents in crusades include David Terrell, R.W. Schambach, Reinhard Bonnke and J. A. Pérez.

Practice by denomination
In Methodism (inclusive of the holiness movement), tent revivals occur at various parts of the year, especially in the summer, for preaching the doctrines of the New Birth (first work of grace) and Entire Sanctification (second work of grace).

Among Baptists, preachers at tent revivals focus their sermons on the New Birth with those receiving it undergoing baptism.

Cultural representations
Blood Meridian, a novel by Cormac McCarthy
Elmer Gantry, a novel by Sinclair Lewis
Resurrection, a film with Ellen Burstyn and Sam Shepard
Marjoe, 1972 documentary film
Joshua, a film with F. Murray Abraham
"Leap of Faith (film)", a film with Steve Martin and Liam Neeson
True Detective (Season 1), starring Matthew McConaughey and Woody Harrelson
Faith Off, an episode of The Simpsons
Justified (TV series), Season 4

See also
 Brush arbor revival
 Camp meeting
 Revival meeting
 Chautauqua

References

Bibliography
 Sims, Patsy. Can Somebody Shout Amen!: Inside the Tents and Tabernacles of American Revivalists. New York: St. Martin's Press, 1988.

External links
 Early Texas Tent Revivals - Information on early 1900s tent revivals in West Texas.
 History Archives, Tent Revivals by J.A. Pérez

Charismatic and Pentecostal Christianity
Christian revivals